The International Cartographic Association (ICA) (ACI), is an organization formed of national member organizations, to provide a forum for issues and techniques in cartography and geographic information science (GIScience). ICA was founded on June 9, 1959, in Bern, Switzerland. The first General Assembly was held in Paris in 1961. The mission of the International Cartographic Association is to promote the disciplines and professions of cartography and GIScience in an international context. To achieve these aims, the ICA works with national and international governmental and commercial bodies, and with other international scientific societies.

Leadership

Presidents 
The first president, Eduard Imhof of Switzerland was heavily involved in founding the association.

Secretaries-General and Treasurers 
The Secretary-General and Treasurer is responsible for the administration and the general running of the Association.

Executive committee
On 20 July 2019 member nations elected the new Executive Committee (EC) of the ICA for the 2019–2023 term. New ICA president is Tim Trainor.

Commissions 

To coordinate international cartographic work Commissions and Working Groups have been established. These are chaired by experts in a specific field of cartography and comprise members from the international Cartography and GIScience community.

 Commission on Art and Cartography
 Commission on Atlases
 Commission on Cartographic Heritage into the Digital
 Commission on Cartography and Children
 Commission on Cartography in Early Warning and Crisis Management
 Commission on Cognitive Issues in Geographic Information Visualization
 Commission on Education and Training
 Commission on Generalisation and Multiple Representation
 Commission on Geospatial Analysis and Modeling
 Commission on Geospatial Semantics
 Commission on GI and Sustainability 
 Commission on History of Cartography
 Commission on Location Based Services
 Commission on Map Design
 Commission on Map Production and Geoinformation Management
 Commission on Map Projections
 Commission on Maps and Graphics for Blind and Partially Sighted People
 Commission on Maps and the Internet
 Commission on Mountain Cartography
 Commission on Open Source Geospatial Technologies
 Commission on Planetary Cartography
 Commission on SDI and Standards
 Commission on Sensor Driven Mapping
 Commission on Topographic Mapping
 Commission on Toponymy
 Commission on Ubiquitous Mapping 
 Commission on Use, User and Usability
 Commission on Visual Analytics

Members
ICA allows two types of memberships:
Affiliate members are organisations, institutions or companies wishing to support the mission and activities of ICA.
National members are national organizations dealing with cartography or geoinformation, such as national mapping agencies.

Conferences
International Cartographic Conferences (ICC) take place every second year in one of the member countries. At every second conference (every fourth year) it hosts the General Assembly of the ICA.

ICC Conferences

Awards

Carl Mannerfelt Gold Medal
The Carl Mannerfelt Gold Medal honours cartographers of outstanding merit who have made significant contributions of an original nature to the field of cartography. It is awarded only on rare occasions. The award is named after the Swedish cartographer, Carl Mannerfelt, who in 1981 won the prize named after him.

Recipients

ICA Honorary Fellowship
The ICA Honorary Fellowship is for cartographers of international reputation who have made special contribution to the ICA. It includes a bronze medal.

ICA Map Awards at the International Map Exhibition
At the biennial International Map Exhibitions at the ICC an international jury selects the best entries.

Barbara Petchenik International Children Map Design Competition
This competition is organized every two years at the ICC. In a national round in all participating ICA member countries, the national winners are selected, which are exhibited during the International Cartographic Conference, where the international winners are selected.

Publications

ICA offers a number of publications.
Its official journal is the International Journal of Cartography (print ISSN: 2372–9333; online ISSN: 2372–9341),
published by Taylor & Francis on behalf of ICA.
It also has three affiliated journals:
The Cartographic Journal
Cartographica
Cartography and Geographic Information Science

See also
 Commission on Maps and the Internet
 List of geography awards

References

External links
ICA web site

Members of the International Council for Science
Cartography organizations
Intergovernmental organizations
Organizations established in 1959
International geographic data and information organizations
Members of the International Science Council